Raymond Rushabiro is a Ugandan film actor, and stage actor. He broke through in his acting career with Uganda's most famous stage group, the Ebonies, appearing in a number of their plays. Rushabiro is also seen in Kweezi Kaganda's Any cow will do alongside former Namasagali old students that was shown at the National Theater of Uganda. His first cinema appearance was as Kasirivu in the movie Bala Bala Sese directed by Lukyamuzi Bashir. He is also appeared in supporting roles in the 2016 Ugandan film The Only Son, Situka (2015) and as a patriarch of the Muwonge family in 5 @Home on Fox Life. He worked on other films and television series including Freedom (2016), Girl from Mparo (2016) and Kyaddala (2019).

He was nominated for Best Actor in a Drama (Movie/TV series) in the 2018 Africa Magic Viewers Choice Award

References

External links
 

Ugandan male film actors
Living people
Year of birth missing (living people)
Place of birth missing (living people)
21st-century Ugandan male actors